MUPS may refer to:

 Major urinary proteins
 Medically unexplained physical symptoms
 the Missing and Unidentified Persons Unit, part of the California Department of Justice